Ruspidge is a village in the Forest of Dean district of west Gloucestershire, England. The civil parish includes Soudley

It is located near the town of Cinderford and in the Forest of Dean. There is one public house called the New Inn.

There is one village shop on the main street (Ruspidge Road), a park and football pitch, as well as a chapel, lying on Railway Road. It is named such because the Ruspidge Halt railway station was situated at the end before its closure in 1958.

Its grid reference is SO 655 125 GB.

References

External links 

 Ruspidge & Soudley Parish Council website; available soon
photos of Ruspidge and surrounding area on geograph

Villages in Gloucestershire
Forest of Dean